was a Japanese actor, voice actor and narrator from Fukushima Prefecture. He graduated from the fine arts department of Nihon University.

He is most known for the roles of Hakaider (Android Kikaider), Doctor Neo Cortex (Crash Bandicoot series), 38 out of 50 Vader Monsters (Denshi Sentai Denjiman), Ryu Jose (Mobile Suit Gundam), Heart (Fist of the North Star), Happosai Ueda (Nintama Rantarou), Nappa (Dragon Ball Z) and Sergeant Bosco Albert "B.A." Baracus (Japanese dub of The A-Team). He played major villain roles in the first eight Metal Hero Series.

Death
Iizuka died from acute heart failure at the age of 89 on February 15, 2023.

Filmography

Television animation
1965
 Astro Boy
 Gigantor
 Wolf Boy Ken
1970
 Tomorrow's Joe (Tiger Ozaki, Gerira, others)
1975
 Brave Raideen (Kyoretsu Gekido)
1977
 Voltes V (Jangal)
1978
 Daimos (Balbas, Isamu Ryūzaki)
1979
 Mobile Suit Gundam (Ryu Jose)
1980
 Space Emperor God Sigma (Shiwai Ritsu)
1981
 Urusei Yatsura (Daimajin)
1982
 Rainbowman (Dongoros)
 Space Adventure Cobra (Dan Brad)
1983
 Fushigi no Kuni no Alice (Humpty Dumpty)
1984
 Fist of the North Star (Heart, Fudou of the Mountain)
 Sherlock Hound (Inspector Lestrade)
1986
 Dragon Ball (Android #8)
1987
 Metal Armor Dragonar (Chephov, Dorchenov)
1988
 Sakigake!! Otokojuku (Raiden)
1989
 Dragon Ball Z (Nappa, Android #8)
 Idol Densetsu Eriko (Kōsuke Tamura)
1990
 Brave Exkaiser (Dinogeist)
 NG Knight Lamune & 40 (Don Harumage)
1991
 Future GPX Cyber Formula (Tetsuichirō Kurumada)
1992
 Tekkaman Blade (Honda)
1993
 Ghost Sweeper Mikami (Santa Claus, Gondawara)
 Nintama Rantarō (Happosai Ueda)
 YuYu Hakusho (Enki)
1994
 Tekkaman Blade II (Honda)
1995
 Street Fighter II V (Dhalsim)
1996
 Detective Conan (Tatsuji Kuroiwa) 
 Rurouni Kenshin (Hyottoko)
1997
 Kindaichi Case Files (Shūichirō Midō)
1998
 Lost Universe (Jill Il)
 Yu-Gi-Oh! (Toei) (Kujirata, Dark Master Zorc)
1999
 Pokémon (Tadokoro)
2002
 Monkey Typhoon (Gantz)
2003
 Ashita no Nadja (Head pirate)
 Planetes (Goro Hoshino)
2004
 Monster (Tomāshu Zoback)
 Paranoia Agent (Keiichi Ikari)
 Pokémon Advanced Generation (Aoba, Genji)
 Samurai Champloo (Zuikō)
2005
 Black Jack (Doctor Asakusa)
 Gun X Sword (Tony)
2006
 Black Jack 21 (Dr. Kuma)
 Ōban Star-Racers (Kross)
 Utawarerumono (Genjimaru)
 Yomigaeru Sora - Rescue Wings (Motomura)
2007
 Deltora Quest (Soldeen)
 Devil May Cry (Pleshio)
 Shugo Chara! (Gozen)
 Doraemon (Mokke)
2008
 One Outs (Yuuzaburou Mihara)
 Soul Eater (Alcapone)
 Stitch! (Dr. Jumba Jookiba)
2009
 Bleach (Baraggan Luisenbarn)
 Fullmetal Alchemist: Brotherhood (Dominic)
 Stitch! ~Itazura Alien no Daibōken~ (Jumba)
2010
 Stitch! ~Zutto Saikō no Tomodachi~ (Jumba)
2012
 K (Daikaku Kokujōji)
2013
 Hajime no Ippo: Rising (Kamogawa Genji)
2014
 Sword Art Online II (Thrym)
2015
 K: Return of Kings (Daikaku Kokujōji)
 Yo-kai Watch ("Komasan's exploration team" narrator)
2017
 Little Witch Academia (Fafnir (ep. 5))
 Onihei (Hikojū)
 Time Bokan 24 (Leonardo da Vinci (ep. 24))
2018
 Puzzle & Dragons X (Teradoragon (ep. 89))
 The Seven Deadly Sins: Revival of The Commandments (Demon King (ep. 21))
2019
 Carole & Tuesday (Fire Brothers)
2020
 White Cat Project: Zero Chronicle (Bal)

Original video animation (OVA)
 Future GPX Cyber Formula OVAs (Tetsuichirou Kurumada)
 Getter Robo Armageddon Benkei Kurama
 Giant Robo (Tetsugyu)
 Legend of the Galactic Heroes Hans Dietrich von Seeckt
 Mobile Suit Gundam MS IGLOO (Martin Prochnow)
 Yotoden (OAV) (Ongyo no Kiheiji)

Film animation
 Memories Iwanofu
 Royal Space Force: The Wings of Honneamise (Space Force Trainer)
 Mystery of Mamo (1978) (Flinch)
 Dragon Ball: Curse of the Blood Rubies (1986) (Pansy's Dad)
 Dragon Ball Z: Lord Slug (1991) (Kakūja)
 Street Fighter II: The Animated Movie (1994) (Thunder Hawk)
 Dragon Ball: The Path to Power (1996) (Artificial Human #8 (8-chan))
 Millennium Actress (2001) (Genya Tachibana)
 Tokyo Godfathers (2003) (Ota)
 Professor Layton and the Eternal Diva (2009) (Curtis O'Donnell)
 Resident Evil: Damnation (2012) (Ivan Judanovich / Ataman)
 Doraemon: New Nobita's Great Demon—Peko and the Exploration Party of Five (2014) (Daburanda)
 Kingsglaive: Final Fantasy XV (2016) (Iedolas Aldercapt)

Video games
 Bloody Roar Extreme (Ganesha / Golan Draphan)
 Crash Bandicoot series (Dr. Neo Cortex (Brendan O'Brien, Clancy Brown, Lex Lang)) (Japanese dub)
 Dragon Ball Z: Budokai series (Nappa)
 Dragon Ball Z: Budokai Tenkaichi series (Nappa)
 Final Fantasy XV (Iedolas Aldercapt)
 Genji: Dawn of the Samurai (Fujiwara no Hidehira)
 Genji: Days of the Blade (Fujiwara no Hidehira)
 God of War III (Cronos (George Ball)) (Japanese dub)
 Hokuto no Ken series (Mr. Heart)
 Kingdom Hearts Birth by Sleep (Dr. Jumba Jookiba)
 Klonoa Heroes: Densetsu no Star Medal (Pango)
 Lego Batman 3: Beyond Gotham (Solomon Grundy (Fred Tatasciore)) (Japanese dub)
 Mega Man 8 (Dr. Thomas Light)
 Mega Man Battle & Chase (Guts Man, Doctor Light)
 Mega Man Legends 2 (Bancoscus)
 Metal Gear Solid 2: Sons of Liberty (Peter Stillman)
 Metal Gear Solid 4: Guns of the Patriots (Ed, Psycho Mantis, Beast unit's voice)
 Ninja Gaiden 2 (Dagra Dai)
 Odin Sphere (Brigand, Belial)
 Policenauts (Ed Brown)
 Rogue Galaxy (Dorgengoa)
 Saint of Braves Baan Gaan (Grandark)
 Shining Force Neo (Graham)
 Shinobido: Way of the Ninja (Kagetora Akame)
 Sly 2: Band of Thieves (Jean Bison) (Japanese dub)
 Street Fighter Alpha 3 (Thunder Hawk)
 Super Adventure Rockman (Dr. Thomas Light)
 Tales of Destiny (Grebaum)
 Tales of Hearts (Zirconia)
 The Space Sheriff Spirits (Don Horror, Psycho, Khubirai)
 Utawarerumono (Genjimaru)

Tokusatsu
 Himitsu Sentai Gorenger (1975-1977) - Crescent Moon Mask / Wing Mask / Horn Mask / Sword Mask / General Iron Mask Temujin / Fire Mountain Mask General Magman / Great General Golden Mask
 J.A.K.Q. Dengekitai (1977) - Devil Killer / Devil Drill / Devil Mite / Devil Wrestler / Devil Wolf / Devil Mummy / Devil Ball / Aringam General / Captain Ghost / Mantis Tribal Chiefn / Cobra Shinto Priest / Shachira Sweat / Chameleon Ieader / Icarus King
 Battle Fever J (1979-1980) - Satan Egos
 Denshi Sentai Denjiman (1980-1981, majority of episodes) - Musasabilar / Shabonlar / Chikagerilar / Tsutakazular / Higekitakolar / Umitsular / Firumular / Denwalar / Hambular / Taiyajikolar / Balar / Adobaloolar / Samelar / Deadbolar / Kaigalar / Gamalar / Hachidokular / Taimular / Kokelar / Hamigakilar / Medamalar / Rekolar / Kilar / Nazolar / Sabimushilar / Chōchinlar / Noranekolar / Kamakilar / Akumalar / Pikarilar / Jishinlar / Ninpolar / Onilar / Torikagolar / Botolar / Sakkalar / Karakurilar / Banriki Monster
 Denshi Sentai Denjiman The Movie (1980) - Ankolar
 Taiyo Sentai Sun Vulcan (1981-1982) - President Hell Satan
 Dengeki Sentai Changeman (1985) - Jeeg / Savoo
Gokiraagin, Butarugin, Scarabgin, Goriwashigin (Voice : Yutaka Ohyama), Sasorinamazugin in Chikyu Sentai Fiveman
 Kyōryū Sentai Zyuranger (1992) - Dora Goldhorn
 Gekisou Sentai Carranger (1996) - PP Chiipuri
 Seijuu Sentai Gingaman (1998) - Morgumorgu
 Hyakujuu Sentai Gaoranger vs. Super Sentai (2001) - Rakuushaa
 GoGo Sentai Boukenger: The Greatest Precious (2006) - Hyde Gene
 Kamen Rider Black (1987-1988) - Gorgom High Priest Darom / Great Mutant Darom
 Kamen Rider Black RX (1998-1989) - Naval Commander Bosgun
 Kamen Rider J (1994) - Earth Spirit / Narrator
 OOO, Den-O, All Riders: Let's Go Kamen Riders (2011) - High Priest Darom and King Dark
Wirepullers of Smart Brain in Kamen Rider 555: Paradise Lost (voice of Gorō Naya & Seizō Katō)
 Space Sheriff Gavan (1982, eps. 1-10) - Don Horror
 Space Sheriff Sharivan (1983-1984) - Demon King Psycho
 Kamen Rider × Super Sentai × Space Sheriff: Super Hero Taisen Z (2013) - Demon King Psycho
 Space Sheriff Shaider (1984-1985) - Lord Kublai
 Kyojuu Tokusou Juspion (1985-1986) - Satan Ghos
 Jikuu Senshi Spielban (1986-1987) - General Deathzero
 Choujinki Metalder (1987-1988) - Battle Robot Army General Doranga
 Sekai Ninja Sen Jiraiya (1988-1989) - Org Ninja Dokusai
 Doctor Giba in Kidou Keiji Jiban (played by Leo Meneghetti)
 Alien Toad (Leader), Alien Genoss in Spectreman
 Avatar Demon King Debonoba (ep16 - 18) in Kaiketsu Lion-Maru
 Alien Gorgon in Silver Mask
 Kumondes in Suki! Suki!! Majo Sensei
 Barom-1 (1972) - Majin Doruge
 Android Kikaider (1972, eps. 36-43) - Hakaider
 Kikaider 01 (1973) - Gilu Hakaider / Black Dragon 
 Inazuman (1973) - Emperor Banba / Flame Fighter
 Alien Virenus in Fireman
 Mr. Asumodi in Dengeki!! Strada 5
 Garba, Sairen in Akumaizer 3
 Seigi no Symbol Condorman (1975) - King Monster
 Space Ironman Kyodain (1976) - Death Gutter
 Ganbaron (1977) - Dowarugin
 Big Sam（Actor : Sugiyama Thunder）in Message from Space
 Machine Bem (majority of episodes) in Spider-Man
 Black Danger Demon King in Red Tiger
  Kapetan in Batten Robomaru
 Dinosaur Hachi in Robot 8 Chan
 Golden Monsu in Seiun Kamen Machineman
 Temple Mirror in Dokincho！ Nemurin
 Legend Teru teru bōzu in Mysterious girl Nile Thutmose
 Zodiac (Actor : Tenmei Basara) in Shichisei Tōshin Guyferd
 Emperor Genbah in Voicelugger
 Great King Mons Drake of the Planet (eps. 1 - 15) in Tensou Sentai Goseiger
 M1 in Ultraman X
 Alexander Icon in Kamen Rider 1

Dubbing roles

Live-action
 Alien (1980 Fuji TV edition) – Parker (Yaphet Kotto)
 The A-Team – Sgt. Bosco Albert "B.A." Baracus (Mr. T)
 Batman (1995 TV Asahi edition) – Lieutenant Eckhardt (William Hootkins)
 Bean – George Grierson (Harris Yulin)
 The Big Brawl (Judge #2)
 Bird on a Wire (1993 TV Asahi edition) – Raun (Alex Bruhanski)
 Black Christmas (1982 Fuji TV edition) – John Graham (Leslie Carlson)
 The 'Burbs (1992 TV Asahi edition) – Uncle Reuben Klopek (Brother Theodore)
 Colors (1991 TV Asahi edition) – Leo "Frog" Lopez (Trinidad Silva)
 The Cotton Club (1988 TBS edition) – Joe Flynn (John P. Ryan)
 Dance with Me – John Burnett (Kris Kristofferson)
 Demolition Man (1997 TV Asahi edition) – Associate Bob (Glenn Shadix)
 The Departed – Arnold French (Ray Winstone))
 The Exorcist (1980 TBS edition) – Pazuzu (Mercedes McCambridge)
 Ghostbusters (1989 TV Asahi edition) – Police Commissioner (Norman Matlock)
 Ghostbusters II (1992 Fuji TV edition) – Vigo (Max von Sydow)
 Glory (1994 NTV edition) – Sergeant Major Mulcahy (John Finn)
 The Gumball Rally (1980 TBS edition) – Steve Smith (Tim McIntire)
 The Hudsucker Proxy – Waring Hudsucker (Charles Durning)
 Hooper (1984 TV Asahi edition) – Roger Deal (Robert Klein)
 Indiana Jones and the Last Crusade (1994 NTV edition) – Sallah (John Rhys-Davies)
 Jacob's Ladder – Louis Denardo (Danny Aiello)
 The Living Daylights (1993 TBS edition) – General Leonid Pushkin (John Rhys-Davies)
 Magnum Force (1987 TV Asahi edition) – Pimp (Albert Popwell)
 Master of the Flying Guillotine – Nai Man (Sham Chin-bo)
 Me, Myself & Irene – Colonel Partington (Robert Forster)
 Mississippi Burning (1992 TV Asahi edition) – Sheriff Ray Stuckey (Gailard Sartain)
 Monty Python's Flying Circus – Terry Jones
 The Mummy Returns – High Priest Imhotep (Arnold Vosloo)
 The NeverEnding Story (Rockbiter (Alan Oppenheimer))
 Only When I Laugh (1989 TV Asahi edition) – Jimmy Perrino (James Coco)
 Piranha (1982 TBS edition) – Mr. Dumont (Paul Bartel)
 Predator (1989 Fuji TV edition) – Billy (Sonny Landham)
 Raise the Titanic (1982 Fuji TV edition) – Captain Andre Prevlov (Bo Brundin)
 Raw Deal (1988 TBS edition) – Steven Hill (Martin Lamanski)
 Revenge (1991 TV Asahi edition) – The Texan (James Gammon)
 The Rocketeer – Eddie Valentine (Paul Sorvino)
 Rocky III (1987 TBS edition) – Clubber Lang (Mr. T)
 The Running Man (1989 Fuji TV edition) – Dynamo (Erland Van Lidth De Jeude)
 Ted – Frank (Bill Smitrovich)
 Ted 2 – Frank (Bill Smitrovich))
 Three Days of the Condor (1980 TV Asahi edition) – Mailman (Hank Garrett)
 Thunderbirds Are Go – The Hood
 Thunderbird 6 – Black Phantom

Animation
 Aladdin (Mud Sultan)
 An American Tail (Moe)
 Babes in Toyland (Goblin King)
 Batman: Assault on Arkham (King Shark)
 Batman: The Animated Series (Garth)
 Finding Mino (Benjamin the Pelican)
 The Black Cauldron (The Horned King)
 G.I. Joe: The Movie (Golobulus, Snow Job)
 Lilo & Stitch franchise (Dr. Jumba Jookiba)
 My Little Pony: Friendship Is Magic (Ahuizotl)
 The Black Cauldron (The Horned King)
 The New Adventures of Winnie the Pooh (Crud)
 The Year Without a Santa Claus (Mayor)
 Timon and Pumbaa (Uncle Boaris)
 Treasure Planet (Billy Bones)

 Up (Carl Fredricksen)
 VeggieTales (Mr. Nezzer)
 We're Back! A Dinosaur's Story (Woog)
 X-Men (TV Tokyo edition) (Juggernaut)

Other
 Tokyo Disneyland Cinderella Castle Mystery Tour (Voice of the Horned King)

Accolades
Merit Award at the Tokyo Anime Awards Festival 2022

References

External links
 Official agency profile 
 
 

1933 births
2023 deaths
Male voice actors from Tokyo Metropolis
Male voice actors from Fukushima Prefecture
Japanese male video game actors
Japanese male voice actors
Nihon University alumni
Sigma Seven voice actors
20th-century Japanese male actors
21st-century Japanese male actors